Amalfi is an Italian town.

Amalfi may also refer to:

Places
 Duchy of Amalfi or Republic of Amalfi, a de facto independent state centred on Amalfi during the tenth and eleventh centuries
 Amalfi Drive, a stretch of road between the Italian towns of Amalfi and Sorrento
 Amalfi, Antioquia, a town and municipality in Colombia

Ships
 Italian cruiser Amalfi, sunk in the First World War
 Amalfi, a later name of the ferry TS Leda

Other uses
 Amalfi: Rewards of the Goddess, a 2009 Japanese film
 Amalfi – Sarah Brightman Love Songs, an album released in conjunction with the film
 "Amalfi", a song by the band Hooverphonic
 Amalfi Award, presented by St John Ambulance
 John Amalfi, main character in the Cities in Flight science fiction novels
 Kinzie Hotel, formerly the Amalfi Hotel Chicago
 Yeso Amalfi (born 1925), Brazilian former footballer